Bematistes macarista is a butterfly in the family Nymphalidae. It is found in Cameroon, Gabon, Equatorial Guinea, the Democratic Republic of the Congo, Uganda, Sudan, Kenya, Tanzania and Zambia.

Description

P. macarista E. Sharpe (59 b, d). The male is similar to that of poggei, but the transverse band of the forewing is of almost uniform breadth, narrower and placed more vertically to the inner margin; in addition it does not reach the distal margin, hence the black ground-colour of the apex is continued to the hinder angle; the white median band of the hindwing is broader than in poggei male and the dark marginal band correspondingly narrower. In the female the transverse band of the forewing is white and terminates at vein 2; its spots in cellules 2 and 3 are cut off obliquely and almost straight towards the base. Cameroons to the Congo and Uganda, ab. plagioscia Baker only differs in having the transverse band of the forewing more deeply incised distally. Congo: Beni Mawambe. male-ab. latifasciata Suff. (59 c) has on the forewing a somewhat broader transverse band, which completely fills up the base of cellule 3. Cameroons. male -ab  moforsa Suff. has the median band on the upperside of the hindwing brown-yellow, only white at the inner margin in cellule 1 a. Congo : Mukenge. male -ab. vendita Grünb. The median band on the upperside of the hindwing is narrower, in cellule 2 only 5 mm. in breadth, and at the costal margin yellow as far as vein 5. Sesse Islands.

Subspecies
Bematistes macarista macarista (Democratic Republic of the Congo, Uganda, Sudan, western Kenya, north-western Tanzania, north-western Zambia)
Bematistes macarista latefasciata (Suffert, 1904) (Cameroon, Gabon, Equatorial Guinea)

Biology
The habitat consists of dense forests.
Both sexes of this dimorphic species are mimicked by the parallel sexes of Pseudacraea eurytus.

References

External links
Die Gross-Schmetterlinge der Erde 13: Die Afrikanischen Tagfalter. Plate XIII 59 b macarista macarista and c (latefasciata) d macarista macarista 
Images representing Acraea macarista at Bold
Images representing Acraea macarista distincta at Bold

Butterflies described in 1906
Acraeini